Tajikistan national amateur Greco-Roman wrestling athletes represents Tajikistan in regional, continental, and world tournaments and matches sanctioned by the United World Wrestling (UWW).

Olympics

World Championship

Asian Games

Asian Championships

Greco-Roman wrestling
Wrestling